The 1941 Dartmouth Indians football team represented Dartmouth College in the Ivy League during the 1941 college football season.  In its first season under head coach Tuss McLaughry, the team compiled a 5–4 record and was outscored by a total of 146 to 104. The team played its home games at Memorial Field in Hanover, New Hampshire.

Quarterback John Krol and halfback Douglas were selected by the United Press as second-team players on the 1941 All-New England football team.

Schedule

References

Dartmouth
Dartmouth Big Green football seasons
Dartmouth Indians football